El Goloso is an administrative neighborhood of Madrid belonging to the district of Fuencarral-El Pardo.

On August 20, 1943, the Armoured Division No. 1 "Brunete" was established at the El Goloso Camp under the command of Major-General Ricardo Rada Peral. 

Wards of Madrid
Fuencarral-El Pardo